Dmytro Vorona (born 24 July 1980 in Donetsk) is a Ukrainian-Russian lawyer, civil servant, activist and politician, who serves as a Russian Federation Senator from Zaporizhzhia Oblast since 2022.

He is the first Senator from the region, which Russia annexed from Ukraine after the 2022 invasion.

Early life
Dmytro Vorona was born in 1980 in Donetsk, Ukrainian SSR, Soviet Union.

Legal career
Vorona became a legal advisor in 1996, five years before he was certified by the Donetsk National University as a specialist in Law. Throughout his career, he held several roles in the town of Makiyivka, which was then part of newly independent Ukraine. This included serving as Assistant to the Head of the Krasnogvardiyskiy District Court, being a lawyer, working in the Justice Department, running legal companies, and serving as an arbitration administrator.

Political career
In 2006, Vorona was appointed Deputy Minister of Environmental Protection of Ukraine. Remaining a deputy minister, his portfolio was switched to the Ministry of Internal Affairs in March 2010 and to the Ministry of Justice in February 2012.

In 2013, Vorona was appointed Chairman of the State Registration Service of Ukraine. During his work he has worked on a number of legislative projects and progressive steps to reform the system of administrative services and introduce "e- services".

Vorona earned a doctorate in law the following year.

An ally of Crimean Prime Minister Sergey Aksyonov, Vorona left mainland Ukraine for the peninsula around the start of the conflict in the east Ukraine region in 2014. He became a Russian citizen five years later.

He then established law firms specialising in providing consulting and legal services in the most common areas of law. At the same time, Vorona became involved in legal charities. In 2015 he founded the "Orthodox Heritage of Ukraine on Mount Athos" charity fund, the aim of which is to help restore and preserve the history and memory of the Mount Athos sanctuary. The aim is also for it to become a platform to provide future prospects of working towards identifying and studying material that reveal the history of the monasteries, their relationships with each other and the outside world and the contribution of the Slavic people to the general treasury of Mount Athos and Orthodox society.

On 20 December 2022, shortly after Russia annexed several east Ukrainian regions amidst its invasion, Vorona was appointed as the representative of Zaporizhzhia Oblast in the Federation Council by Governor Yevgeny Balitsky. He was sanctioned by the European Union for taking up the role. A second representative will be chosen by the new regional legislature after country-wide regional elections in September 2023.

Honours
Order of Merit of the 3rd degree, awarded by the Cabinet of Ministers of Ukraine.

References

External links
 Dmytro Vorona facebook

Ukrainian politicians
1980 births
Living people
Donetsk National University alumni
Recipients of the Honorary Diploma of the Cabinet of Ministers of Ukraine
Members of the Federation Council of Russia (after 2000)